Robert A. Flaten (born 1934, Northfield, Minnesota) was an American diplomat who served as the United States ambassador to Rwanda 
from 1990 to 1993.  Flaten retired in May 1994 and is chair of the Executive Committee of the Nobel Peace Prize Forum.

Flaten has a Ph.D. from the University of Pennsylvania, an M.A. in International Relations from The George Washington University and a B.A. from St. Olaf College.

Rwanda

In 1993, Flaten reported his concerns about Hutus from Burundi in Rwanda.

References

External links
DECISION ON INTERLOCUTORY APPEAL RELATING TO THE TESTIMONY OF FORMER UNITED STATES AMBASSADOR ROBERT FLATEN

1934 births
Living people
Ambassadors of the United States to Rwanda
St. Olaf College alumni
Elliott School of International Affairs alumni
University of Pennsylvania alumni
People from Northfield, Minnesota
20th-century American diplomats